The Ugly is a 1997 New Zealand horror film, the first feature directed and written by Scott Reynolds. The film starred Paolo Rotondo, Rebecca Hobbs, Jennifer Ward-Lealand, and Roy Ward. The film is about a psychiatrist who is meeting with a serial killer to determine whether or not he has been successfully cured. They delve into a journey through his past and his victims, and through this "The Ugly," a distorted allusion to The Ugly Duckling, is revealed. It was nominated for best film awards at festivals in New Zealand, Portugal and the United States.

Plot
Inside of an old, decrepit insane asylum in Auckland, detained serial killer Simon Cartwright (Paolo Rotondo) seeks to be reevaluated by an outside psychiatrist to prove that he has been cured. He specifically asks for Dr. Karen Schumaker (Rebecca Hobbs), who has recently gained some notoriety from winning a case involving another serial killer. Simon is abused by Philip and Robert (Paul Glover and Christopher Graham), two orderlies at the asylum. When Karen arrives, she argues with the head of the asylum, Dr. Marlowe (Roy Ward), who believes she is getting involved in Simon's case for the publicity. As she is led to her first session with Simon, another patient named Marge (Darien Takle) warns Karen to watch out for "The Ugly."

Simon's backstory is explored through a series of flashbacks. As a youth, Simon was the target of abuse by his mother (Jennifer Ward-Lealand). She drove away the only person Simon had ever cared about, Julie (Vanessa Byrnes), and had prevented his wealthy father from taking custody and giving him a better life. In response to this, Simon murdered his mother and, after an attempt to cover up the crime, was locked in an asylum for five years. Upon his release Simon killed over a dozen random people, including Julie. However, Simon spared the life of a teenaged deaf girl, recognizing that she was like him. Simon explains that it is "the ugly" that makes him kill; it will not leave him alone until he has satisfied its voice. Karen discovers that "The Ugly" is Simon's alternate persona, and that he has psychic powers.

At the end, Simon kills Philip and Robert, escapes the insane asylum, and kills Karen.

Cast
 Paolo Rotondo as Simon Cartwright
 Caelem Pope as Simon, aged 4
 Sam Wallace as Simon, aged 13
 Rebecca Hobbs as Dr. Karen Shumaker
 Roy Ward as Dr. Marlowe
 Paul Glover as Philip
 Cristopher Graham as Robert
 Darien Takle as Marge
 Jennifer Ward-Lealand as Evelyn Cartwright
 Cath McWhirter as Helen Ann Miller
 Vanessa Byrnes as Julie
 Beth Allen as Julie, aged 13

Reception

The film received mixed reviews. On Rotten Tomatoes, the film has an approval rating of 40% based on 5 reviews, with a weighted average of 5.44/10.

IMDb has a rating of 6.0/10.0 with 57 reviews and 37 critic reviews.

Special effects
Director Scott Reynolds made a stylistic decision to depict all blood shed in the movie as a dark, black color. Author John Kenneth Muir writes in his book, Horror Films of the 1990s, about how this visual cue may suggest that Simon never saw his victims as being human, making it easier for him to kill.

Awards
The film has won 7 awards and received 7 nominations.

At the 1999 Academy of Science Fiction, Fantasy & Horror Films (USA) awards the film was a nominee for the best home video release.

Fangoria Chainsaw Awards (1999) they were a nominee for best limited-release/direct-to-video film, best actor (Paulo Rotondo) and best actress. (Rebecca Hobbs)

At FantaFestival (1997) it won best actor. (Paulo Rotondo)

Fantasporto (1998) it won 2 awards and had 1 nomination. Best actress (Rebecca Hobbs) and outstanding first feature. (Scott Reynolds) it had a nomination for best film.

New Zealand Film and TV Awards (1997) it won 2 awards, best contribution to design (Richard Taylor) and best design. (Grand Major)

Puchon International Fantastical Film Festival (1997) it won 1 award and had 1 nomination. Citizen of choice award and best of puchon.

Sitges - Catalonian International Film Festival (1997) it won 1 award and had 1 nomination. Best director and best film.

References

External links
 
 

1997 films
New Zealand horror films
New Zealand independent films
1990s psychological thriller films
1990s serial killer films
1997 horror films
1997 independent films
1990s English-language films